Dorcadion eurygyne is a species of beetle in the family Cerambycidae. It was described by Suvorov in 1911.

See also 
Dorcadion

References

eurygyne
Beetles described in 1911